What Men Know (German: Was wissen denn Männer) is a 1933 German drama film directed by Gerhard Lamprecht and starring Hans Brausewetter, Erwin Kalser and Toni van Eyck. It was shot at the Babelsberg Studios in Berlin. The film's sets were designed by the art director Werner Schlichting. It was remade as the Swedish film What Do Men Know? the same year.

Synopsis
A young woman from the country has a relationship with a travelling salesman who then abandons her. When she falls pregnant from the affair it causes a local scandal.

Cast
 Hans Brausewetter as 	Karl Christians
 Erwin Kalser as Herr Barthel
 Toni van Eyck as	Hertha Barthel
 Ruth Hellberg as 	Gertrud Kroschelt
 Ilse Korseck as Margot
 Eduard Rothauser as 	Invalide Schultheiss
 Elsa Wagner as 	Mutter Kroschelt
 Fritz Odemar as Oberpostsekretär Haber
 Hans Hermann Schaufuß as 	Vater Kroschelt
 Hedy Krilla as Fräulein Berghuhn

References

Bibliography 
 Kreimeier, Klaus. The Ufa Story: A History of Germany's Greatest Film Company, 1918-1945. University of California Press, 1999.
 Rentschler, Eric. The Ministry of Illusion: Nazi Cinema and Its Afterlife. Harvard University Press, 1996.

External links 
 

1933 films
1933 drama films
German drama films
Films of the Weimar Republic
1930s German-language films
Films directed by Gerhard Lamprecht
German black-and-white films
Films shot at Babelsberg Studios
UFA GmbH films
Films scored by Eduard Künneke
1930s German films